.sdc may refer to:

 Secure Download Cabinet files
 StarOffice calc files